(Everything according to God's will alone), 72, is a church cantata by Johann Sebastian Bach. He composed it in Leipzig in 1726 for the third Sunday after Epiphany and first performed it on 27 January 1726. Bach used the opening chorus for the Gloria of his Missa in G minor, BWV 235.

History and text 
Bach composed Alles nur nach Gottes Willen in his third cantata cycle for the Third Sunday after Epiphany. The prescribed readings for the Sunday were taken from the Epistle to the Romans, rules for life, and from the Gospel of Matthew, the healing of a leper. The cantata text was written by Salomon Franck, who was Bach's librettist when they both worked for the ducal court in Weimar. Ihr, die ihr euch von Christo nennet, BWV 164, is a comparable example of Bach turning to a text by Franck late.

The closing chorale "" was written by Albert, Duke of Prussia in 1547. The chorale theme (Zahn 7568) by Claudin de Sermisy first appeared in print in the collection of secular songs Trente et quatre chansons in 1528. Bach had used the chorale before as the base for his chorale cantata , composed for the same occasion in 1725.

Bach led the first performance of the cantata on 27 January 1726. He later used the opening chorus for the Gloria of his Missa in G minor, BWV 235.

Music

Scoring and structure 
Bach structured the cantata in six movements. Bach scored the work for three vocal soloists (soprano (S), alto (A) and bass (B)), a four-part choir, and a Baroque instrumental ensemble of two oboes (Ob), two violins (Vl), two obbligato violins (Vs), viola (Va) and basso continuo. The duration of the cantata is given as 20 minutes.

In the following table of the movements, the scoring follows the Neue Bach-Ausgabe. The keys and time signatures are taken from Alfred Dürr, using the symbol for common time (4/4). The continuo, playing throughout, is not shown.

Movements 

Although Franck had marked the first movement as an aria, Bach composed it as a chorus, opened by a ritornello dominated by runs of two measures in the violins, finally also in the continuo. The voices pick up the runs on the word "" (all), soprano first, and imitate each other one measure after the other, resulting in a complex image of "all". A rather quiet middle section on the words "" (God's will shall calm me) in canonic imitation is accompanied by the orchestra, the following words "" (among clouds or sunshine) are illustrated by runs as in the beginning, but starting in a low range by the bass. The first and last section end with the choir embedded in the ritornello.

In his arrangement for the Gloria of the Missa, Bach dropped the first ritornello, adapted the words "" to the first section, "" to the middle section, and "" to the last section.

The first recitative begins as a secco, but develops to an arioso on the words "" (Lord, as you will), which are repeated nine times with a different continuo line, culminating in "" (I will not die) the following line is again secco.

The following aria begins immediately with the voice, to ensure a connection between recitative and aria, then follows an unusual ritornello, a fugue with the two violins and the continuo.

In the second aria, more like a song and dance, the instruments play a ritornello and repeat it after a short sung passage: "" (My Jesus will do it, He will sweeten Your cross). In the following main section the voice is embedded in the ritornello. The words of the middle section "" (Although your heart lies in many troubles) are sung in the minor mode. After the following ritornello the soloist repeats once more as a final statement, "" (my Jesus will do it!).

The closing chorale is a four-part setting.

Recordings 
 Bach Made in Germany Vol. 1 – Cantatas III, Günther Ramin, Thomanerchor, Gewandhausorchester, boy soloists of the Thomanerchor, Hans Hauptmann, Leipzig Classics 1956
 Die Bach Kantate Vol. 24, Helmuth Rilling, Figuralchor der Gedächtniskirche Stuttgart, Bach-Collegium Stuttgart, Arleen Augér, Hildegard Laurich, Wolfgang Schöne, Hänssler 1972
 Les Grandes Cantates de J.S. Bach Vol. 29, Fritz Werner,  Heinrich-Schütz-Chor Heilbronn, Württembergisches Kammerorchester Heilbronn, Ingeborg Reichelt, Barbara Scherler, Bruce Abel, Erato 1973
 J. S. Bach: Das Kantatenwerk – Sacred Cantatas Vol. 4, Nikolaus Harnoncourt, Tölzer Knabenchor, Concentus Musicus Wien, boy soprano Wilhelm Wiedl, Paul Esswood, Ruud van der Meer, Teldec 1977
 Bach Edition Vol. 4 – Cantatas Vol. 1, Pieter Jan Leusink, Holland Boys Choir, Netherlands Bach Collegium, Ruth Holton, Sytse Buwalda, Bas Ramselaar, Brilliant Classics 1999
 J. S. Bach: Cantatas for the 3rd Sunday of Epiphany, John Eliot Gardiner, Monteverdi Choir, English Baroque Soloists, Joanne Lunn, Sara Mingardo, Stephen Varcoe, Archiv Produktion 2000
 J. S. Bach: Complete Cantatas Vol. 19, Ton Koopman, Amsterdam Baroque Orchestra & Choir, Sandrine Piau, Bogna Bartosz, Klaus Mertens, Antoine Marchand 2002

References

Cited sources 
Bach Digital
 

Books

 

Online sources

External links 
 
 Cantata BWV 72 Alles nur nach Gottes Willen history, scoring, sources for text and music, translations to various languages, discography, discussion, Bach Cantatas Website
 BWV 72 Alles nur nach Gottes Willen English translation, University of Vermont
 BWV 72 Alles nur nach Gottes Willen text, scoring, University of Alberta
 Chapter 13 BWV 72 Alles nur nach Gottes Willen / All things are just as God wills. Julian Mincham, 2010
 Luke Dahn: BWV 72.6 bach-chorales.com

Church cantatas by Johann Sebastian Bach
1726 compositions